is the 21st single from Aya Matsuura, and her last single as part of Hello! Project. It was released on February 11, 2009 under the Zetima label, meant to be a Valentine's Day's gift. Video for the song was released on DVD as 'Single V' on February 25, 2009.

Track listing

CD
 
 
 "Chocolate Damashii" (Instrumental)

DVD
 "Chocolate Damashii"
 "Chocolate Damashii (Sweet Ayaya ver.)"

External links 
 Chocolate Damashii entry on the Up-Front Agency official profile
 Chocolate Damashii CD entry on Up-Front Works discography website
 Chocolate Damashii DVD entry on Up-Front Works discography website

Aya Matsuura songs
Japanese-language songs
Zetima Records singles
2009 singles
2009 songs